Morgan Berry is an American voice actor and singer. She is best known for her voice roles in various anime shows, films, video games, and web series. Berry is also a recording artist and YouTube Personality under the name "The Unknown Songbird".

Filmography

Anime

Films

Video Games

Web series

Discography 
As Morgan Berry:
 Fearless	
 Voltron Heroes

As The Unknown Songbird:
Unravel
Diver
Heroes
Crossing Field
Resonance
Butter-Fly
The Day

References

External links

Year of birth missing (living people)
Living people
American non-binary actors
American video game actors
American voice actors
LGBT YouTubers
21st-century American actors
21st-century American LGBT people
Bisexual non-binary people
American bisexual actors